Hoseynabad-e Khoda Bandeh (also Romanized as Ḩoseynābād-e Khodā Bandeh; also known as Hosein Abad and Ḩoseynābād) is a village in Chahdegal Rural District, Negin Kavir District, Fahraj County, Kerman Province, Iran.

Demographics

2006 Cesus
At the 2006 census, its population was 155, in 39 families.

References 

Populated places in Fahraj County